Abiomyia is a genus of flies in the family Stratiomyidae.

Species
Abiomyia annulipes Kertész, 1914
Abiomyia brunnipes Yang, Zhang & Li, 2014
Abiomyia higona Nagatomi, 1975
Abiomyia pallipes Brunetti, 1927

References

Stratiomyidae
Brachycera genera
Taxa named by Kálmán Kertész
Diptera of Asia